United Nations Security Council Resolution 155, adopted on 24 August 1960, after examining the application of the Republic of Cyprus for membership in the United Nations, the Council recommended to the General Assembly that the Republic of Cyprus be admitted.

The resolution was adopted unanimously.

See also
List of United Nations Security Council Resolutions 101 to 200 (1953–1965)

References
Text of the Resolution at undocs.org

External links
 

 0155
 0155
1960 in Cyprus
 0155
August 1960 events